On Thursday and Never Again is a 1977 Soviet drama film directed by Anatoly Efros.

Plot 
The film tells about a doctor who, before his wedding, wants to visit his mother, who lives in the province, but wants to do it without a bride, because his ex-girlfriend Varia lives there and expects a child from him.

Cast 
 Lyubov Dobrzhanskaya as Yekaterina Andreyevna
 Oleg Dahl as Sergey
 Innokenty Smoktunovsky as Ivan Modestovich
 Vera Glagoleva as Varya
 Aleksandr Ozhigin as Direktor
 Mikhail Zhigalov as Yegor
 Vladimir Plotnikov
 Viktor Karlov as Kharitonov
 Grazina Baikstyte as Grazhina (as Grazhina Baykshtite)
 Marina Korotkova
 Irina Korotkova

References

External links 
 

1977 films
1970s Russian-language films
Soviet drama films
1977 drama films